Battlegore Burial Chamber is a Bronze Age burial chamber located in Williton, Somerset. It is composed of three round barrows and possibly a long, chambered barrow. The site was excavated in 1931 by George Gray. The name "Battlegore" comes from this site being attributed to the location of a Danish raid in 918 AD or 988 AD. At least as early as the 14th century, the site was referred to as "Bytelgore", a predecessor of the word "Battlegore". Along with three nearby round barrows it has been scheduled as an ancient monument.

Description 
Gray found four other mounds in addition to this small one, but he was unable to find anything that would indicate the importance of these small mounds. A large urn, found  to the east of the center of the barrow, contained the cremated remains of a human.

Between this and the southernmost of the three major barrows is a ring ditch, which might be another barrow. Unlike the previous barrow, this one has not been ploughed, and as such it is in better condition.

The chambered barrow is composed of three stones. According to legend, the devil and a giant's quarrel caused these stones to be thrown there.

Artifacts 
Neolithic pottery and flint artifacts have been found at this site. Archaeologists also found bronze items, including a "knife dagger", a broken dagger, a rapier, a spearhead, and a winged axe. A field of Mesolithic flint artifacts has been found to the north of Battlegore.

See also 

 Bronze Age Britain
 Neolithic British Isles

References

External links 
 Battlegore Burial Chamber shown on a map

Barrows in the United Kingdom
History of Somerset
Neolithic England
Scheduled monuments in West Somerset
Bronze Age sites in Somerset